Ivan Vasilievich Argamakov (Russian: Иван Васильевич Аргамаков; 1763 – 1834) was a commander of the Imperial Russian Army during the Napoleonic Wars. His final rank was major general, to which he was promoted in 1815.

References

External links

Russian commanders of the Napoleonic Wars
1763 births
1834 deaths